The January 2021 Baghdad bombings were a pair of terrorist attacks that occurred on 21 January 2021, carried out by two suicide bombers at an open-air market in central Baghdad, Iraq. They killed at least 32 people and injured another 110. This was the Iraqi capital’s first terrorist attack since 2019.

Background
Since late 2017, the period in which the Islamic State was defeated, terrorist attacks in Iraq became rare. From 2003 to 2017, attacks were common in the entire country, with Baghdad and nearby cities being the main targets. The last major deadly attack against civilians, during the post-war period, occurred in January 2018 at the same location, leaving at least 35 people dead.

Attack
In the early hours of the morning, a clothing market in Tayaran Square, central Baghdad, was crowded as people were shopping after the market recently reopened, after being closed for about a year due to the COVID-19 pandemic in Iraq. An attacker entered and yelled “My stomach is hurting!" in Arabic. As nearby people got close to him, he pressed a detonator in his hand and blew himself up, killing several people. A second suicide bomber then struck and killed 32 civilians and wounded more than 110 others. Several of these civilians were in critical condition.

Responsibility
Amaq News Agency credited Islamic State of Iraq and the Levant bombers. The claim, which was released hours after the attack, stated that the organization targeted Shia Muslims. This was later backed up by an official statement from ISIL claiming responsibility for both attacks.

Aftermath
The Kata'ib Hezbollah militia accused the United States, Israel and Saudi Arabia of being responsible for the attack, vowing to transfer the "battle" into Saudi Arabia.

On 22 January 2021, missile and drone strikes targeted Saudi capital Riyadh. Iraqi militia “The True Promise Brigades” claimed responsibility and said the attacks were done as revenge for the bombings done by ISIL, which they accuse Riyadh of supporting. Saudi government held the Yemeni Houthi movement responsible but the Houthis denied launching the strike. On 28 January, Abu Yasser al-Issawi, a senior ISIS commander, was killed by Iraqi Armed Forces in Al-Chai Valley, southern Kirkuk.

International reactions
Bahrain, Canada, Egypt, France, Iran, Kuwait, Jordan, Lebanon, Malaysia, Tunisia, Turkey, Saudi Arabia, the United Arab Emirates, Qatar, the United States, Yemen, as well as the partially recognised State of Palestine condemned the attacks.

The Gulf Cooperation Council  condemned the attack with the Secretary-General Nayef Al-Hajraf “offering condolences and sympathy to the families of the victims and wished the injured a speedy recovery.”

See also
26 July 2007 Baghdad market bombing
2021 Erbil rocket attacks
International military intervention against ISIL
List of terrorist incidents in 2021
List of terrorist incidents in Iraq
List of terrorist incidents linked to ISIL
List of wars and battles involving ISIL
Persecution of Shias by ISIL
Timeline of Baghdad

References

2021 murders in Iraq
2021 bombings
21st-century mass murder in Iraq
ISIL terrorist incidents in Iraq
Islamic terrorist incidents in 2021
January 2021 crimes in Asia
Marketplace attacks in Iraq
Mass murder in 2021
2021 bombings
Suicide bombings in 2021
2021
Terrorist incidents in Iraq in 2021
Violence against Shia Muslims in Iraq